The Salcia is a right tributary of the river Ier in Romania. It flows into the Ier near Săcueni.

References

Rivers of Romania
Rivers of Bihor County